Gatineau is a federal electoral district in Quebec, Canada, represented in the House of Commons of Canada from since 1949. Between 1987 and 1996, it was known as "Gatineau—La Lièvre".

It consists of part of the former city of Gatineau, Quebec as defined by its pre-2002 boundaries.

The adjacent ridings are Hull—Aylmer, Pontiac, Ottawa—Orléans, and Ottawa—Vanier.

History

The district was created in 1947 from parts of Hull and Wright ridings. In 1987, it was renamed to Chapleau, and then to Gatineau—La Lièvre in 1988. It was renamed back to "Gatineau" in 1996.

Gatineau lost territory to Pontiac during the 2012 electoral redistribution.

Members of Parliament

This riding has elected the following Members of Parliament:

Assad represented Gatineau—La Lièvre from 1988 to 1997 which was known as Chapleau from 1987 to 1988. This district had similar borders to Gatineau.

Politics
Like most ridings in the Outaouais, Gatineau had long been safe for the Liberals, save for a lone Progressive Conservative victory in their 1984 nationwide landslide.  Even as the rest of Quebec turned its back on the Liberals, a large number of civil servants who worked in Ottawa kept it in Liberal hands.

However, in the 2006 election the Bloc Québécois won the seat. The Bloc managed to hold the seat with just over 29% of the vote in 2008, by far the lowest percentage for a winning candidate nationwide, due to a near-three-way split between themselves, the New Democratic Party and the Liberals. The riding was swept up in the massive NDP wave that swept through the province in the 2011 election.

In the 2015 election, Liberal candidate Steve MacKinnon, running a second time, defeated NDP incumbent Françoise Boivin in an upset with an almost 40-point swing.

Election results

1997–present

|-

Note: Conservative vote is compared to the total of the Canadian Alliance vote and Progressive Conservative vote in the 2000 election.

Gatineau—La Lièvre (1988-1993)

|-
  
|Liberal
|Mark Assad
|align="right"|23,507
|
  
|Progressive Conservative
|Claudy Mailly
|align="right"| 21,385    
|
 
|New Democratic
|Marius Tremblay 
|align="right"| 8,394   
|

|
 
|No affiliation
| Nicole Leblanc
|align="right"| 364    
|

  
|Liberal
|Mark Assad
|align="right"|39,274

  
|Progressive Conservative
|Jérôme P. Falardeau
|align="right"|4,464   
 
|New Democratic
|Elizabeth Holden 
|align="right"|1,096   
  
|Natural Law
|Danièle Bélair 
|align="right"|736

1949–1988

Note: Social Credit vote is compared to Ralliement créditiste vote in the 1968 election.

	
Note: Ralliement créditiste vote is compared to Social Credit vote in the 1963 election.

See also
 List of Canadian federal electoral districts
 Past Canadian electoral districts

References

Campaign expense data from Elections Canada
Riding history 1947-1987 from the Library of Parliament
Riding history 1996-present from the Library of Parliament

Notes

Politics of Gatineau
Quebec federal electoral districts